Graham Haley is a best New York Times best-selling author and TV show host known for his series Haley’s Hints. Since its launch, the show has expanded from Canada to the United States to South America to Europe to Asia, and to Africa.  
 
He was born in Africa. After numerous years working a variety of jobs, Haley began acting in theater, radio, film, and television. He emigrated to Canada in 1978, where he founded The Comedy Bank. This association led him to a comedy series on Canadian radio.  
 
He lives in Toronto with his wife Rosemary and daughters Erin, Kerry, and Anna.
 
He spends time outside of the Haley's Hints performing voice-overs for TV and radio commercials.

Publications 

 Haley's Hints (2004) 
Haley's Hints Green Edition: 1000 Great Tips to Save Time, Money, and the Planet! (2009) 
Haley's Cleaning Hints (2004) 
Haley's Handy Hints : 1001 Practical Ideas (1987)

References

Canadian television hosts
Living people
Year of birth missing (living people)